Jardin d'émail (1968-1974) also known as Enamel garden is an outdoor sculpture in the Kröller-Müller Museum in Otterlo, The Netherlands. The sculpture was created by artist Jean Dubuffet. The artwork was designed for the Kröller-Müller Museum.

History
From 1968-1974 artist Jean Dubuffet completed the Jardin d'émail sculpture. In English the work is called Enamel garden. The materials used in the work include: Concrete, glass fiber reinforced epoxy resin, polyurethane and paint. It is a large sculpture which is billed as: "A work of art that you can touch, that you can walk through, in which you are even allowed to play!". The dimensions of the work are  x  x . The artwork was designed specifically for the Kröller-Müller Museum.

In 2020 the sculpture was closed while it underwent a restoration. The surface of the artwork was in poor condition which necessitated the "complete removal of its painted surface and innovative planning for the precise replication". Care was taken to follow the artist's original paint scheme and pattern. The restoration process made use of photogrammetry (3D imaging technique that uses photographs to make 3D models) to reproduce the artist Hand-painted markings on what was a very large surface area.

Design
The piece is designed with a stark white color interspersed with jagged black lines. Visitors can walk on the surfaces of the sculpture and interact with it. ARTnews magazine describes it as "an immersive and interactive environment".

See also
 List of outdoor sculptures in the Netherlands

References

External links
Video Jardin d'émail by Jean Dubuffet (English subtitles)

Outdoor sculptures in the Netherlands
1974 sculptures
Abstract sculptures in the Netherlands
Sculptures in Amsterdam
20th-century sculptures